Curassanthura is a genus of isopod crustaceans in the family Leptanthuridae. It contains the following species:
Curassanthura bermudensis Wägele & Brandt, 1985
Curassanthura canariensis Wägele, 1985
Curassanthura halma Kensley, 1981
Curassanthura jamaicensis Kensley, 1992

References

Cymothoida
Taxonomy articles created by Polbot

Isopod genera